Patient's Friends Society - Jerusalem (PFS) is a Palestinian non-governmental organization founded in 1980 by Palestinian academics and health professionals.  The Society is located on the grounds of  Augusta Victoria Hospital on the Mount of Olives, Jerusalem. 
PFS is a registered independent nonprofit organization. The work of this organization depends on external funding.

"Sunrise," a cancer support group for women was founded by three cancer patients in 2000. PFS provides psycho-social support for patients, survivors and their families from all over the country. PFS also provides lymphoedema care and support as well as mastectomy bras and prostheses.

PFS was awarded the International Achievement Award from the American Cancer Society in 2006, for being an exemplary model of excellence in partnership in the global fight against cancer.

References

External links
 Official Site

Medical and health organizations based in the State of Palestine
Mount of Olives
Breast cancer organizations